The Ministry of Education, Heritage and Arts is the ministry of Fiji responsible for overseeing Fiji's education system. The current Minister for Education is Aseri Radrodro, who was appointed to the position in December 2022

Responsibilities 
The Ministry is tasked to conduct and deliver education services to all Fijian students. The Ministry has numerous responsibilities - advising the government, providing administrative and management support, enacting policies and acts, and providing learning resources such as text books. The Ministry is also tasked to make and distribute external exams to schools all over the country.

Besides the government providing free education to primary and secondary school students, they also provide free text books and free bus fare initiatives.

Ministers

See also 

 Education in Fiji

References 

Education in Fiji
Government of Fiji
Government ministries of Fiji